Krishnavatara is a series of seven novels written by K.M. Munshi. A projected eighth novel was not completed. The series is based on life of Lord Krishna and the epic Mahabharata series.

Books 
 Krishnavatara I: The Magic Flute
 Krishnavatara II: The Wrath of an Emperor
 Krishnavatara III: The Five Brothers
 Krishnavatara IV: The Book of Bhima
 Krishnavatara V: The Book of Satyabhama
 Krishnavatara VI: The Book of Vedavyaasa The Master
 Krishnavatara VII: The Book of Yudhishthira
 Krishnavatara VIII: The Book of Kurukshetra (incomplete)

Synopsis
Krishnavatara I: The Magic Flute opens with the marriage of Vasudava and Devaki, sister of Kamsa and daughter of Ugrasena. Sage Narada prophesied to Kamsa that eighth the child of Devaki would kill him. He imprisons Devaki and Vasudava. Kamsa kill killed six children of Devaki. Gargacharya and Akrura rescue the last two children, Balarama and Krishna, from Kamsa and gives them to Nanda. Warned by the gods, Kamsa sends Putana to kill Krishna but Putana fails. Krishna kills Trinavarta and uproots Arjuna trees. Krishna survives an encounter with Kaliya and holds Gowardhan to save Vrindavana. When Kamsa learns about Krishna's miracles, he sends Akrura to take Krishna to Mathura. Krishna and Balarama go to mathura and kill Kamsa.

Krishnavatara II: The Wrath of an Emperor is based on Harivamsa. The book opens with the coronation of Ugrasena. Krishna and Balarama travel to Sandipani ashram. Sandipani's son Punardatt is abducted by Punyajaya so Krishna and Udhhava kill Punyajava to support Punardatt. Punardatt was in Vaivastapuri (land of death), but Krishna saves him. After they complete their education Krishna and Balarama return to Mathura. Soon Yadavas get news that Kamsa's father-in-law Jarasandha will attack Mathura. Krishna escapes with Balarama to save Yadavas. They come to Mount Gomantaka, but Jarasandha arrives there and set Gomantaka on fire. Krishna and Balarama fight and defeat Jarasandha. Krishna also kills Shrigalava and defeats Karavirapura. Jarasandha adopts a new strategy to marry Rukmini to Shisupala by arranging false Swayamvara. Krishna and his army of Yadavas travel to Kundinpura claiming to pay homage to Rukmini's grandfather Kaisika. Jarasandha postpones Swayamvara because of Krishna. Krishna learns that Kalayavana plans to attack Mathura. Krishna and the Yadavas leave Mathura for Dwarka. Krishna meets Kalayavana and misleads him, Mmuchukunda then burns Kalayavana. Krishna returns to Kundinpura and abducts and marries Rukmini.

Krishnavatara III: The Five Brothers is based on the Mahabharata story of Pandavas who escapes from Varanavata and the evil plan of Duryodhana. Satyavati asks Krishna to find her great grandson Pandavas. Krishna finds him in Rakshavarta with the help of Udhhava and Nagas. Pandavas marries Draupadi.

Krishnavatara IV: The Book of Bhima deals with Bhima who falls in love with Jaladhara, sister of Duryodhana's wife Bhanumati, who died delivering a son. Yudhisthira shares his Kingdom with Duryodhana, angering Bhima. Krishna convinces Bhima to leave Hastinapur. Pandavas with help of Krishna and other Yadavas builds a new city Indraprastha.

Krishnavatara V: The Book of Satyabhama narrates the story of Syamantaka, jewel of Satrajit. Satrajit Yadava was against Krishna so he gives up Syamantaka to Prasanajita and claims Krishna tried to steal it. Krishna with the help of Satyabhama and Satyaki find Syamantaka in bear-world. Krishna marries Jambavati and escapes from bear-world. Satyabhama gives Syamantaka to Prasanajita and marries Krishna.

Krishnavatara VI: Book of vedavyaasa the master starts when sage Parashara takes his son Krishna (Vyasa) by fishergirl Matsyagandha. Parashara wants to rebuild Dharmakshetra ashram, but Parashara is killed by wolves. When Krishna (Dwaipayana) wants to re-establish ashram, Rakshasas attack on him but save by Jabali. Krishna went to Hastinapur to meet king Shantanu to re-establish the glory of Dharmakshetra. In Hastinapur, Krishna discovers his mother as queen Satyavati. Krishna convinces Vibhuti, Shotriya of Hastinapur to join Vajapeya Yagna. Dharmakshetra is re-established. Many years later Vyasa and wife Vatika, daughter of Jabali, have son Suka. Suka is caught by Mocca, but Vyasa frees him. Vyasa also performs Niyoga to save Kuru lineage.

Krishnavatara VII: Book of Yudhisthira deals with Yudhisthira who wants to perform Rajayusa Yagna. He asks Krishna for help. Krishna, Arjuna and Bhima go to Magadha. Bhima kills Jarasandha and establishes Sahdeva as king. During Rajasuya, Bhishma suggests Agrapooja to Krishna. Shisupala cannot bear it and tries to kill Krishna, but Krishna beheads him. Vyasa tells Yudhisthira that he has become the centre of the great war, so Yudhisthira becomes worried and accepts Duryodhana's invitation to play dice. In the game he loses his wealth, brother, wife and himself. Dushasana tries to unwrap Draupadi, but is saved by Krishna. In the last game Yudhisthira loses again and is exiled for 12 years.

Krishnavatara VIII: Book of kurukshetra starts with the news that Krishna's father vasudava has been taken by Salwa of Saubha, so he sent his son Pradhyumna to deal with Salwa. Salwa's minister Vajranabhi imprisoned Pradhyumna by order of Salwa and Vajranabhi married his daughter Prabhavati to Pradhyumna. At the time Mayavati came to help him escape Salwa.

Preface

References

20th-century Indian novels
Novel series
Novels based on the Mahabharata